Marcos Soares (born February 16, 1961) is a Brazilian sailor and Olympic champion. He won a gold medal in the 470 Class with Eduardo Penido at the 1980 Summer Olympics in Moscow.

1980 Olympics
The gold medal in the 470 class was quite a surprise. With an additional Brazilian victory in the Tornado class by Alexandre Welter and Lars Björkström, a fourth place in the Finn class, a sixth in the Soling class, and eight in the Flying Dutchman, Brazil was best sailing nation at the 1980 Olympics.

References

External links

1961 births
Living people
Brazilian male sailors (sport)
Sailors at the 1980 Summer Olympics – 470
Olympic sailors of Brazil
Olympic gold medalists for Brazil
Olympic medalists in sailing
Medalists at the 1980 Summer Olympics